Neil R. McMillen (born 1939) is an American historian, and professor emeritus at University of Southern Mississippi.

Life
He graduated from the University of Southern Mississippi with a BA and MA, and from Vanderbilt University with a Ph.D. His papers are held at University of Southern Mississippi.

Awards
 1990 Bancroft Prize
 1990 Gustavus Myers Prize
 1990 McLemore Prize
 1990 Pulitzer Prize finalist
 2005 B. L. C. Wailes Award

Works
"The American Reaction to the Rise of Nazi Germany, March, 1933 - March, 1934" (USM thesis, 1963)

 (7th Edition 1992)

   (1st edition 1971)

References

21st-century American historians
21st-century American male writers
University of Southern Mississippi faculty
University of Southern Mississippi alumni
Vanderbilt University alumni
Living people
Bancroft Prize winners
American male non-fiction writers
1939 births